The Town of Dillon is a home rule municipality located in Summit County, Colorado, United States. The town population was 1,064 at the 2020 United States Census, a +17.70% increase since the 2010 United States Census. Dillon is a part of the Breckenridge, CO Micropolitan Statistical Area.

History
The original town of Dillon was built as a stage stop and trading post on the northeast side of the Snake River. The town was named for Tom Dillon, a prospector, and was incorporated in 1883. By 1892 the town had been relocated twice, both times in order to be closer to railroad lines that were extended into the area. All three of these historic townsites were situated very close to the Blue River Valley confluence where the Snake River and Tenmile Creek flowed in, and this area is now referred to collectively as "Old Dillon".

During the Great Depression, Denver Water began acquiring land around Dillon. In 1956, residents and business owners in Dillon were notified that they would need to sell their property and move out, because Denver Water was about to begin construction on a dam just downstream from the town, and the resulting reservoir (which would help supply water to Front Range communities) was going to flood Dillon and the surrounding valley. About a mile to the north, some land on a hillside was set aside for the current townsite, which is now situated on the shoreline of Dillon Reservoir.

Geography
Dillon is located at  (39.627659, -106.044199).

At the 2020 United States Census, the town had a total area of  including  of water. Dillon Dam and its reservoir (Lake Dillon) are adjacent.

Climate
According to the Köppen climate classification, Dillon has an alpine subarctic climate (Dfc). Summer days are usually warm, but with nights dropping close to freezing. Winter days are cold, with massive amounts of snowfall.

Demographics

As of the census of 2000, there were 802 people, 369 households, and 195 families residing in the town. The racial makeup of the town was 95.64% White, 0.87% African American, 1.00% Native American, 0.12% Asian, 1.87% from other races, and 0.50% from two or more races. Hispanic or Latino of any race were 10.35% of the population.

There were 369 households, out of which 21.4% had children under the age of 18 living with them, 42.5% were married couples living together, 7.3% had a female householder with no husband present, and 46.9% were non-families. 31.7% of all households were made up of individuals, and 6.0% had someone living alone who was 65 years of age or older. The average household size was 2.17 and the average family size was 2.62.

In the town, the population was spread out, with 15.5% under the age of 18, 10.8% from 18 to 24, 39.2% from 25 to 44, 25.6% from 45 to 64, and 9.0% who were 65 years of age or older. The median age was 37 years. For every 100 females, there were 123.4 males. For every 100 females age 18 and over, there were 125.2 males.

The median income for a household in the town was $49,821, and the median income for a family was $59,107. Males had a median income of $36,304 versus $26,042 for females. The per capita income for the town was $32,727. About 4.7% of families and 6.3% of the population were below the poverty line, including 9.2% of those under age 18 and 4.4% of those age 65 or over.

Notable people
Notable individuals who were born in or have lived in Dillon include:
 Richard F. Bansemer, Lutheran pastor
 Frederic J. Brown III, U.S. Army lieutenant general
 Millie Hamner, Colorado state legislator
 Enid Markey (1894–1981), actress
 Julie McCluskie, member of the Colorado House of Representatives
 Duane D. Pearsall (1922–2010), smoke detector entrepreneur
 Christine Scanlan, Colorado state legislator

See also

Colorado
Bibliography of Colorado
Index of Colorado-related articles
Outline of Colorado
List of counties in Colorado
List of municipalities in Colorado
List of places in Colorado
List of statistical areas in Colorado
Breckenridge, CO Micropolitan Statistical Area
Dillon Reservoir
Front Range
Tenmile Range
White River National Forest

References

External links

Town of Dillon website
CDOT map of the Town of Dillon
Lake Dillon Fire Protection District

Towns in Summit County, Colorado
Towns in Colorado
Populated places established in 1883
1883 establishments in Colorado